"Think About You" is a song by the American rock band Guns N' Roses, featured on the band's debut studio album, Appetite for Destruction (1987).  Although credited to the group, the song was primarily composed by rhythm guitarist, Izzy Stradlin, who also plays lead guitar on it.

Live
"Think About You" was played very frequently during early Guns N' Roses shows in 1985 and 1986, however, it was not played again until 2001. It was frequently played in 2002 and occasionally played in 2006, with former rhythm guitarist Izzy Stradlin joining the band for a few performances. It has not been performed since the 2009/2010 tour.

Personnel
 W. Axl Rose – lead vocals
 Slash – lead and rhythm guitars, acoustic guitar
 Izzy Stradlin – rhythm and lead guitars, backing vocals
 Duff "Rose" McKagan – bass
 Steven Adler – drums

References

Notes

Guns N' Roses songs
1987 songs
Songs written by Izzy Stradlin